Miller Township is the name of some places in the U.S. state of Pennsylvania:

Miller Township, Huntingdon County, Pennsylvania
Miller Township, Perry County, Pennsylvania

Pennsylvania township disambiguation pages